Carole Boston Weatherford is an African-American author and critic, now living in North Carolina, United States.  She is the winner of the 2022  Coretta Scott King Award for Unspeakable: The Tulsa Race Massacre. She writes children's literature and some historical books, as well as poetry and commentaries. Weatherford is best known for her books Juneteenth Jamboree, Freedom in Congo Square, and You Can Fly: The Tuskegee Airmen. Notably, Weatherford has written literary criticisms of racist representations in children's entertainment. Today, she often writes with her son, Jeffery Boston Weatherford, who is an illustrator and poet.

Biography 
The music of poetry has fascinated Weatherford and motivated her literary career.
 
Weatherford began writing in first grade by dictating poems to her mother. Her father taught printing at a local high school and published his daughter's early works. As a child, she enjoyed reading Dr. Seuss and Langston Hughes. Continuing to pursue creative writing as a hobby through high school and college, she later earned her M.F.A. from the University of North Carolina at Greensboro and an M.A. in publication design from the University of Baltimore. Although a Baltimore native, she now resides in North Carolina and teaches composition and children's literature at Fayetteville State University (FSU). Initially, Weatherford was invited to FSU as a writer-in-residence, but in 2007, she received the position of associate professor.
 
As an author, she acknowledges her calling "to mine the past for family stories, fading traditions and forgotten struggles." The books she writes, in poetry and prose, explore African-American history from a children's perspective and relate the past to new generations. Her works are often inspired by true events, many of which took place in the areas where Weatherford has lived. In her Author's Notes for each book, she includes a portion of the historical research from which her fiction or poetry emerged. In describing her purpose for writing to School Library Journal, in a 2008 interview, she said: "I want the books that I write that are set during the Jim Crow era and the Civil Rights era to nudge today's kids toward justice. We've gone a long way, but we still have a long way to go."
 
In 1995, Lee & Low Books published her first picture book, Juneteenth Jamboree, about a summer celebration in memory of the Texas Emancipation. She then wrote a series of board books for preschoolers. In 1998, she co-authored Somebody's Knocking at Your Door: AIDS and the African American Church, and then published a collection of poetry, The Tar Baby on the Soapbox. After establishing herself as a versatile writer for both children and adults, she published two nonfiction chapter books before penning her first award-winning children's book, The Sound That Jazz Makes (2001), a poem that traces the history of African-American music.
 
Since then, she has continued to write poetry, historical fiction, and nonfiction biographical works for children. She said in a 2008 interview that one of the most important poems she has written was Moses: When Harriet Tubman Led Her People to Freedom: "Those inspired words came together with Kadir Nelson's soulful paintings and Ellice Lee's brilliant art direction in a perfect publishing storm. Moses propelled my career to another level." Moses has won a Caldecott Award for illustration, as well as an NAACP Image Award for an Outstanding Literary Work for Children, and became a New York Times bestseller.
 
In 2008, Weatherford published her first poetic novel for young adults, Becoming Billie Holiday, about the development of the artist who she refers to as her muse.

In 2020, Weatherford published Box: Henry Brown Mails Himself to Freedom which was named a Newbery Honor Book.

Her book Unspeakable: The Tulsa Race Massacre, illustrated by Floyd Cooper and published by Carolrhoda Books, won both the Coretta Scott King Illustrator & Author awards in 2022. The novel was also a finalist for the Caldecott Medal as well as the Robert F. Sibert Informational Book Award.

Literary criticism 
Weatherford has written multiple articles attacking what she identifies as stereotyped caricatures of black people in East Asian popular culture, with two of the more prominent ones being geared toward anime, and another aimed at the name of a toothpaste brand.

Pokémon
In January 2000, Weatherford wrote an op-ed piece that ran in newspapers across Alabama. "Politically Incorrect Pokémon" explained how she believed that Pokémon #124, Jynx, was a negative stereotype of African Americans:

In response to the controversy, Jynx's in-game sprites were given a purple skin color in the American versions of Pokémon Gold and Silver, released in late 2000. By 2002, Nintendo officially redesigned Jynx, changing its skin color from black to purple; this change was not reflected in the animated series until Jynx's purple skin appearance debuted in the episode "Mean With Envy!" (混戦、混乱！ポケモンコンテスト・キナギ大会！ （前編）), which originally aired in 2005, with the Amazon Prime release of "Holiday Hi-Jynx" recoloring Jynx accordingly, although it is still black on the thumbnail.

Dragon Ball
In an article published in The Christian Science Monitor in May 2000, Weatherford reiterated and expanded on her argument. Jynx had looked like "an obese drag queen" and she also offered Mr. Popo, a character from the Dragon Ball franchise, up for critique:

The Dragon Ball manga later released by Viz in 2003 had reduced the size of Mr. Popo's lips. Furthermore, media related to the series' sequel Dragon Ball Super showed an increase of black characters that strayed away from racist stereotypes, such as that of Goten and Trunks' classmates Rulah and Chok, and fewer references made to Mr. Popo (with the latest release Dragon Ball Super: Super Hero only indicating the character being off-screen).

Awards

Bibliography 
Juneteenth Jamboree, with Yvonne Buchanan (illustrator), 1995, Lee & Low Books, 
Grandma and Me, with Michelle Mills (illustrator), 1997, Writers & Readers Publishing, 
Me & the Family Tree, with Michelle Mills (illustrator), 1997, Writers & Readers Publishing, 
Mighty Menfolk, with Michelle Mills (illustrator), 1997, Writers & Readers Publishing, 
My Favorite Toy, with Michelle Mills (illustrator), 1997, Writers & Readers Publishing, 
Somebody's Knocking at Your Door: AIDS and the African-American Church, with Ronald J. Weatherford (Author) and Harold G. Koenig (Author), 1998, Routledge, 
The Tar Baby on the Soapbox, 1999, Methodist College, 
Sink or Swim: African-American Lifesavers of the Outer Banks, 1999, Coastal Carolina Press, 
The African-American Struggle for Legal Equality, 2000, Enslow Publishers, 
The Sound that Jazz Makes, with Eric Velasquez (illustrator), 2001, Walker Books, 
Sidewalk Chalk: Poems of the City, with Dimitrea Tokunbo (illustrator), 2001, Wordsong, 
Princeville: The 500-Year Flood, 2001, Coastal Carolina Press, 
Remember the Bridge: Poems of a People, 2002, Philomel Books, 
Jazz Baby, with Laura Freeman (illustrator), 2002, Lee & Low Books, 
Stormy Blues, 2002, Xavier Review Press, 
Great African-American Lawyers: Raising the Bar of Freedom, 2003, Enslow Publishers, 
Freedom on the Menu: The Greensboro Sit-Ins, with Jerome Lagarrigue (illustrator), 2005, Dial Books for Young Readers, 
A Negro League Scrapbook, 2005, Boyds Mills Press, 
The Carolina Parakeet: America's Lost Parrot in Art and Memory, 2005, Avian Publications, 
Moses: When Harriet Tubman Led Her people to Freedom, with Kadir Nelson (illustrator), 2006, Jump at the Sun/Hyperion, 
Dear Mr. Rosenwald, with R. Gregory Christie (illustrator), 2006, Scholastic Press, . Second (paperback) edition: CreateSpace Independent Publishing Platform, 2017, .
Champions on the Bench: The 1955 Cannon Street YMCA All-Stars, with Leonard Jenkins (illustrator), 2006, Dial Books for Young Readers, 
Jesse Owens: Fastest Man Alive, with Eric Velasquez (illustrator), 2006, Walker Books, 
Before John Was a Jazz Giant: A Song of John Coltrane, with Sean Qualls (illustrator), 2007, Henry Holt, 
Celebremos Juneteenth, with Yvonne Buchanan (illustrator), 2007, Lee & Low Books, 
Birmingham, 1963, 2007, Wordsong, 
I, Matthew Henson, with Eric Velasquez (illustrator), 2007, Walker Books, 
The Library Ghost, with Lee White (illustrator), 2008, Upstart Books, 
Becoming Billie Holiday, with Floyd Cooper (illustrator), 2008, Wordsong, 
Racing Against the Odds: Wendell Scott, African American Stock Car Champion, 2009, Marshall Cavendish Children's Books, 
Voice of Freedom: Fannie Lou Hamer, Spirit of the Civil Rights Movement, 2015. Illustrator Ekua Holmes was the 2016 winner of the Steptoe Award for New Talent.
Gordon Parks: How the Photographer Captured Black and White America, with Jamey Christoph, 2015. Whitman, Albert & Company, .
Freedom in Congo Square, with R. Gregory Christie, 2016. little bee books, . 
In Your Hands, with Brian Pinkney, 2017.  Atheneum Books for Young Readers, .
You Can Fly: The Tuskegee Airmen, with Jeffrey Boston Weatherford, 2017. Atheneum Books for Young Readers, .
Schomburg: The Man Who Built a Library, with Eric Velasquez, 2017. Candlewick, .
How Sweet the Sound: The Story of Amazing Grace, with Frank Morrison, 2018. Atheneum Books for Young Readers, .
Be a King: Dr. Martin Luther King Jr.’s Dream and You, with James E. Ransome, 2018. Bloomsbury USA (Children), .
The Roots of Rap: 16 Bars on the 4 Pillars of Hip-Hop, with Frank Morrison, 2018. little bee books, .
BOX: Henry Brown Mails Himself to Freedom, illustrations by Michele Wood, 2020. Candlewick, .
Unspeakable: The Tulsa Race Massacre, illustrations by Floyd Cooper, 2021. Carolrhoda Books, .
A Song for the Unsung: Bayard Rustin, the Man Behind the 1963 March on Washington, illustrations by Byron McCray, 2022. Henry Holt and Co., ISBN 9781250779502.

References

External links 
All articles about racist Pokémon by Carole Boston Weatherford — See "Articles/ Information" section
2007 Audio Interview of Carole Boston Weatherford
 Weatherford reads from Dear Mr. Rosenwald and answers questions from her 3rd grade readers
 Weatherford performs her works at Vanderbilt University

African-American women writers
African-American children's writers
American non-fiction children's writers
American women children's writers
American children's writers
Historians of African Americans
Carter G. Woodson Book Award winners
University of South Carolina alumni
Writers from Baltimore
Writers from North Carolina
People from High Point, North Carolina
Living people
Place of birth missing (living people)
Year of birth missing (living people)
21st-century African-American people
21st-century African-American women